There were local government elections in London on Thursday 22 May 2014. All councillor seats on the 32 London borough councils were up for election. The electorates of Hackney, Lewisham, Newham and Tower Hamlets also elected their executive mayors, who operate in place of council leaders in those boroughs. Ward changes took place in Hackney, Kensington and Chelsea, and Tower Hamlets, which reduced the total number of councillors by 10 to 1,851. Both the mayoral and councillor elections are four-yearly.

The results saw London Labour achieve their best result in over 40 years, winning 1,060 councillors, control of 20 out of 32 councils and 38% of the popular vote (their highest since 1998). Only the elections of 1964, 1971 and 1974 have seen Labour win more than 1,060 council seats in London, and Labour has not controlled 20 councils or more since 1971. This result was subsequently surpassed by the party's performance in the 2018 elections.

The London Conservatives dropped to their lowest-ever percentage of the vote in a London local election, at just 26.4%, and fell to their lowest councillor total since 1998. The London Liberal Democrats' vote halved, with the party dropping to 11% of the popular vote and 116 seats (down 130), the worst result for the Lib Dems or the Liberals since 1978.

The election saw a record vote for parties outside the 3 major parties, with UKIP, the London Green Party, independents and other minor parties winning a collective 25.4% of the vote, the highest since the creation of the London Boroughs in 1964. 63 minor party or independent councillors were elected in total.

UKIP and the Greens saw their best-ever results in terms of vote share (9.8% for the Greens and 9.5% for UKIP), but whilst UKIP gained 12 seats, the Greens gained just 2.

Following the elections, two of the thirty two London borough councils were in no overall control, a decrease of one. All four mayoral elections returned the incumbent mayors: 3 Labour and 1 Tower Hamlets First.

Results summary

Turnout: 2,284,882 voters cast ballots, a turnout of 38.9% (−23.1%).

Councils results

Others and notes

Overall councillors by party

|}

Three seats in Barnet (Colindale) and three in Tower Hamlets (Blackwall and Cubitt Town) were vacancies until elections held on 26 June 2014 in Colindale and on 3 July 2014 in Blackwall and Cubitt Town.

Opinion polling

Mayoral results
In four London boroughs the executive function of the council is a directly elected mayor. The mayoral elections take place at the same time as councillor elections in those boroughs.

Ward result maps

London-wide 
The map below shows the results for each ward across the whole of Greater London.

By borough

References

 
May 2014 events in the United Kingdom
2014